The  Instituto Mexicano de Ejecutivos de Finanzas (IMEF) was founded in 1961 as a private nonprofit organization for finance executives in Mexico. This institute has representation groups in its major cities, a total of 20 groups work with a national structure whom are responsible for representing the Financial Management sector in the public and private sector of Mexico who in turn, are part of the 17 national technical committees of the institute. 

Considered as IMEF subdivisions, there are chapters created by the institute in an effort to link the younger generations of future financial executives in the country; these are IMEF Universitario and IMEF Nueva Generación.

The Mexican Institute of Financial Executives (IMEF) is a founding member of the International Association of Financial Executives Institutes (IAFEI) and takes credit for some serious and renowned variety of print media with both Mexican and international authors. Since 1984, the IMEF has awarded several participants in its research investigation contest and most recently since 2003 in conjunction with Deloitte the Premio Internacional IMEF-Deloitte

History

On September 21, 1961, the Mexican Institute of Financial Executives (IMEF) was created as an organization dedicated to the technical development of its associates in the financial area, based on the professional excellence and human quality. The affiliated members of the IMEF have been, throughout the years, the financial management leaders of Mexico's major enterprises and government institutions in both public and private sectors, and a distinguished group of academics and researchers highly committed to the economic and financial challenges of Mexico and Latin America.
 
The foundation of the institute is established by the influence, leadership and significance of its partners since 1961 who have contributed to strengthen the Institute and its position in Mexico. In the years 1971, 1981, 1991, 2001 and 2012 IMEF was host of the annual IAFEI World Congress.

Mission

To promote the integral development of financial professionals, exercising leadership in all the activities performed.

IIEEM

Indicador IMEF del Entorno Empresarial (IMEF Index for Business Environment)

The Mexican Institute of Financial Executives created, in a joint venture with the government agency the INEGI, the Indicador IMEF del Entorno Empresarial (IIEEM) thus making the first indicator of private sector that has the technical regulation and support of a public institution in México.

The Indicador IMEF del Entorno Empresarial is a factory index that measures the business climate around the expected economic environment or trajectory direction of economic activity in the very short term, this index is divided in two: the manufacturing and non-manufacturing subdivisions. The IIEEM emulates the methodology of that in the Institute for Supply Management (ISM) of United States.

The data that this index compiles is provided by the enterprises where the IMEF associates are currently present, gathered along with business organizations of outstanding relevance in the area such as Confederación Patronal de la República Mexicana (Coparmex), American Chamber of Commerce, la Asociación Nacional de la Industria del Plástico (ANIPAC), la Cámara Nacional de la Industria de la Transformación (CANACINTRA) y la Confederación de Cámaras Industriales (CONCAMIN)

Premio de Investigación IMEF-EY

In 1984 the IMEF research foundation awarded the first investigation contest. In 2003 the IMEF joined Deloitte to spread the financial research applicable in Mexico and Latin America through this international open contest that has for objective to promote and encourage research on topics of interest to the macro-financial environment, as well as business and public finance.

The examining jury consists in:

Head of the Secretaría de Hacienda y Credito Público (Department of Finance and Credit)
Governor of the Bank of Mexico (central bank)
President of the Comisión Nacional Bancaria y de Valores (National Banking and Values Commission)
President of the Consejo Coordinador empresarial (Business Coordinating Council)
President of the Instituto Mexicano de Contadores Públicos (Mexican Institute of Public Accountants)
National chairman of Instituto Mexicano de Ejecutivos de Finanzas (IMEF)
Director of the Consejo Nacional de Ciencia y Tecnología (National Council for Science and Technology)
Managing Director of Deloitte in Mexico
Authorities of higher education in Mexico

References

Business and finance professional associations
Professional associations based in Mexico